Rem Ivanovich Viakhirev (23 August 1934 – 11 February 2013) was a Russian businessman. From 1992 to 2001, he was chairman of Gazprom. In May 2001, Viakhirev had to resign as chairman during Putin's consolidation of economic power. His successor is Alexey Miller.

Biography 
Vyakhirev was born on August 23, 1934, in the village of Great Chernigovka, Kuybyshev Oblast.

Between 1976 and 1978, he was director of Orenburg Gazdobycha Company. Between 1978 and 1982, he was the Chief Engineer of "
Orenburg Gazprom.

Between 1983 and 1985, he was Deputy Minister of Gas Industry of the USSR and the Chairman of Tyumen Gazprom company. In 1986, he became the First Deputy Minister of Gas Industry of the Soviet Union.

In 1989, he was appointed as chairman of Gazprom concern. From 1992 to 2001, he was the Gazprom CEO.

Since May 1996, he was the chairman of Siberian Oil Company. Since 1994, he was a member of the Governmental Council for Industry policy and business. Between 1994 and 1995, he was chairman of Imperia Bank. Since 1995, he was member of Board of directors of the Russian Public Television.

Between 2001 and 2002, he was the chairman of the Russian Oil Company (RGO). Viakhrev died in Moscow on February 11, 2013 at the age of 78.

Personal life 
Viakhirev was married. He had a son, daughter, grandson and two granddaughters.

References

External links 
 Biografie bei flb.ru 
 Biografie bei prazdniki.ru 

1934 births
2013 deaths
People from Samara Oblast
Russian billionaires
Gazprom people
Our Home – Russia politicians
20th-century Russian politicians
Recipients of the Order of Lenin
Recipients of the Order of Friendship of Peoples
Communist Party of the Soviet Union members
State Prize of the Russian Federation laureates
Recipients of the USSR State Prize
Recipients of the Order "For Merit to the Fatherland", 4th class